Nicolaus Adriani (15 September 1865, Oud-Loosdrecht – 5 August 1926, Poso, Central Sulawesi) was a Christian missionary from the Netherlands who did work in Indonesia. He studied linguistics of the East Indies at Leiden University, obtaining his PhD in 1893. He was sent by the Nederlandsch Bijbelgenootschap. He worked as a linguist in Poso, Central Sulawesi.

In 1897 Adriani became correspondent of the Royal Netherlands Academy of Arts and Sciences, in 1918 he joined as member.

References

Relevant literature
Adriani, N., 1894. Sangireesche spraakkunst. 's Gravenhage: Martin Nijhoff.
Adriani, Nicolaus. 1912. De Baree-Sprekende Toradja's van Midden Celebes. 
Adriani, Nicolaus. 1919. Posso (Midden-Celebes). Boekhandel van den Zendingsstudie-raad.
Adriani, Nicolaus. 1928. Bare'e-Nederlandsch woordenboek: met Nederlandsch-Bare'e register. EJ Brill.
Adriani, Nicolaus. 1928. "Spraakkunstige schets van de taal der Mĕntawai-Eilanden." Bijdragen tot de Taal-, Land-en Volkenkunde van Nederlandsch-Indië 1ste Afl, 1-117.
Adriani, Nicolaus, and Albertus C. Kruyt. The Bare'e-speaking Toradja of Central Celebes:(the East Toradja). 
Adriani, Nicolaus, and Albertus C. Kruyt. 1914. "De Bare’e-sprekende Toradja’s van Midden-Celebes. Vol 3: Taal-en letterkundige schets der Bare’e taal en overzicht van het taalgebied: Celebes-Zuid-Halmahera." Batavia: Landsdrukkerij (1914). (Adriani, Nicolaus. Posso (Midden-Celebes). Boekhandel van den Zendingsstudie-raad, 1919.(Human Relations Area Files, 1968.)

1865 births
1926 deaths
19th-century linguists
Dutch Protestant missionaries
Leiden University alumni
Linguists from the Netherlands
Linguists of Austronesian languages
Members of the Royal Netherlands Academy of Arts and Sciences
People from Wijdemeren
Protestant missionaries in Indonesia
Missionary linguists